Zirkel may refer to:

 Zirkel (Studentenverbindung), a symbol used in European student societies
 Dorsum Zirkel, a wrinkle ridge in Mare Imbrium on the Moon
 Mount Zirkel, in the Rocky Mountains of Colorado
 USS Zirkel (ID-3407), a cargo ship that served in the United States Navy from 1918 to 1919
 Albert Zirkel (1885–?), American wrestler who competed in the 1904 Summer Olympics
 Ferdinand Zirkel (1838–1912), German geologist and petrographer

German-language surnames
Occupational surnames